Brad William Henke (April 10, 1966 – November 29, 2022) was an American actor and National Football League (NFL) and Arena Football League (AFL) player. He was best known for his role as Corrections Officer Desi Piscatella on Orange Is the New Black, for which he won the Screen Actors Guild Award for Outstanding Performance by an Ensemble in a Comedy Series in 2016.

Early life and education
Henke was born in Columbus, Nebraska. He attended the University of Arizona and played football as a defensive lineman.

Career

Football career 

Henke was drafted by the New York Giants in the 1989 NFL Draft but got cut during training camp. He was picked up by the Denver Broncos, and he played in Super Bowl XXIV against the San Francisco 49ers. Repeated injuries, which required six ankle surgeries, led to his retirement from professional football in 1994.

Acting 
Henke began acting in 1994, starting with commercials. He appeared in October Road, Around June, The Amateurs, World Trade Center, In the Valley of Elah, Choke, Sherrybaby, Must Love Dogs and Fury.

His television career includes roles in Arliss, ER, Dexter, Lost, Justified, The Office, Orange Is the New Black, Sneaky Pete, and MacGyver (2016).

Henke's breakout role has been on Orange Is the New Black as Desi Piscatella, a gay corrections officer at Litchfield Federal Penitentiary. He joined OITNB'' in the fourth season. He was part of the cast that won the Screen Actors Guild Award for Outstanding Performance by an Ensemble in a Comedy Series for 2016.

Personal life and death  

Henke was married to actress Katelin Chesna from 2001 to 2008. 

In an Instagram post dated May 15, 2021, Henke stated that he had a 90 percent blockage of an artery. In another post dated June 29, 2021, he stated that he had two stents put in his heart, as well as his pancreas and half of his spleen removed to treat a "golf ball sized" tumor.

Henke died in his sleep on November 29, 2022, at the age of 56.

Filmography

Film

Television

References

External links

1966 births
2022 deaths
American male film actors
American male television actors
Male actors from Nebraska
People from Columbus, Nebraska
Arizona Wildcats football players
Denver Broncos players
Fort Worth Cavalry players
20th-century American male actors
21st-century American male actors
American football defensive ends
Players of American football from Nebraska